"Objector" is the 25th television play episode of the first season of the Australian anthology television series Australian Playhouse. "Objector" was written by Tony Morphett and produced by Brian Faull and originally aired on ABC on 3 October 1966.

Morphett went on to become one of the leading writers in Australian television.

Plot
A man is conscripted to fight in Vietnam. He wants to go to court to argue against his and his father, a war veteran, calls him a coward.

Cast
 John Derum as the son
 Syd Conabere as the father
 Julie Costello as the girlfriend

Production
Morphett originally wrote the story as a short story for the Adelaide Festival Literary Contest. It was written soon after the Federal Government introduced conscription for Vietnam, but Morphett says it is not "a propagandist play."

It was filmed in Sydney.

Reception
The Bulletin TV critic said the "play kept wandering from prose poetry to plain Australian and back again, like a novice punter trying to pick a two-horse race without a form guide."

The Age said it was "a drama so true to life it hurt." A different critic from the same paper said it "wasn't really a play. It was merely sort of a visual illustration of a voice told by a narrative in the background. The viewer was supposed to exercise his imagination... An actor is supposed to play a part."

The same paper later called it "a noteworthy example how a dramatist can contribute to a worthy understanding."

See also
 List of television plays broadcast on Australian Broadcasting Corporation (1960s)

References

External links
 
 
 

1966 television plays
1966 Australian television episodes
1960s Australian television plays
Australian Playhouse (season 1) episodes
Black-and-white television episodes